The Soulanges Canal is an abandoned shipping canal in Quebec, Canada. It follows the north shore of the Saint Lawrence River between Pointe-des-Cascades and Coteaux-Landing, bypassing the rapids between Lake Saint-Louis and Lake Saint-Francis. In between, it passes through the towns of Les Cèdres and Coteau-du-Lac. It superseded the first Beauharnois Canal which was on the south shore of the Saint Lawrence.

The Soulanges Canal was named after the Soulanges Seigneury which was granted in 1702 by Governor Louis-Hector de Callière to Pierre-Jacques de Joybert, Knight and Lord of Soulanges.

Operation of the Soulanges Canal was powered by a small hydro electric generating station. "Le Petit Pouvoir" is located near the middle of the canal and provided power for the motorized lock gates, electrical operation of the swing bridges, and illumination for the entire length of the canal at night. It was the first canal in the world to have its entire passageway lit by night, allowing round-the-clock operation. It opened in 1899 and remained in operation until 1958 when it was in turn superseded by an enlarged Beauharnois Canal which is now part of the Saint Lawrence Seaway.

Today, a popular cycling path follows the route of the canal. In the past there have been plans to reopen the canal to pleasure boats, but these have not materialized.

On May 22, 1974, five college women were killed when their car was hit by another, and they were pushed into the canal.  Four of the women were students at Potsdam State College in Potsdam, NY.  The other was a student at Albany State College in Albany, NY.

See also
 Coteau-du-Lac canal
 Lachine Canal
 Sainte-Anne-de-Bellevue Canal

References

External links

 Soulanges Canal at the Canadian Canal Society 
 Sébastien Daviau et Édith Prégent. Le canal de Soulanges (1899-1958) : une aventure technologique et humaine - exposition virtuelle du Musée régional de Vaudreuil-Soulanges 
 A photo collection of the Soulanges Canal in use: http://stlawrencepiks.com/seawayhistory/beforeseaway/soulanges/

Ship canals
Saint Lawrence Seaway
Canals in Quebec
Buildings and structures in Montérégie
Canals opened in 1899
1899 establishments in Canada
Transport in Vaudreuil-Soulanges Regional County Municipality